Calore may refer to:

 Calore, an Italian civil parish of the municipalities of Venticano (AV) and Mirabella Eclano (AV)
 Calore Irpino, an Italian river of the provinces of Benevento and Avellino (Campania)
 Calore Lucano, an Italian river of the province of Salerno (Campania)
 Calore, an album of the Italian singer Renato Zero